The Minds of Billy Milligan is a non-fiction novel portraying Billy Milligan, the first person in U.S. history acquitted of a major crime by pleading dissociative identity disorder. The novel was originally published in 1981, written by Hugo Award-winning author Daniel Keyes, who received a bachelor's degree in psychology from Brooklyn College in 1950.

The sequel, entitled The Milligan Wars, was later published in Japan in 1994. According to the author, its release in the United States is tied to the release of the upcoming film adaptation entitled The Crowded Room.

Awards

Won 
 1986: Kurd Lasswitz Award for Best Book by a Foreign Author
 1993: Seiun Award for Non-Fiction of the Year

Nominated 
 1982: Edgar Award for Best Fact Crime

See also
Shelter, a 2010 film by Måns Mårlind and Björn Stein.
Split, a 2016 film by M. Night Shyamalan.

References

1981 non-fiction books
English-language books
American non-fiction books
Non-fiction crime books
Non-fiction novels
Novels set in Ohio
American novels adapted into films
Random House books
Non-fiction books adapted into television shows